Admiral Dacres may refer to:

James Richard Dacres (Royal Navy officer, born 1749) (1749–1810), British Royal Navy vice admiral
James Richard Dacres (Royal Navy officer, born 1788) (1788–1853), British Royal Navy vice admiral
Richard Dacres (Royal Navy officer) (1761–1837), British Royal Navy vice admiral
Sydney Dacres (1804–1884), British Royal Navy admiral